Kahrizak District is in Ray County, Tehran province, Iran. At the 2006 National Census, its population was 129,607 in 31,295 households. The following census in 2011 counted 140,177 people in 35,934 households. Up until 16 September 2012, Qaleh Now Rural District, including all the villages now in Chaleh Tarkhan Rural District, was part of Kahrizak District. the two mentioned rural districts separated from Kahrizak District, forming Qaleh Now District. At the latest census in 2016, Kahrizak District had 124,704 inhabitants in 35,649 households.

References 

Ray County, Iran

Districts of Tehran Province

Populated places in Tehran Province

Populated places in Ray County, Iran